The 2011–12 English football season is Wigan Athletic's seventh consecutive season in the Premier League. The club also competed in the League Cup and the FA Cup.

At the end of the 2011–12 Premier League, Wigan Athletic finished in 15th place, two points below 14th-placed Stoke City. Wigan's last game of the Premier League season was a 3–2 victory against already-relegated Wolverhampton Wanderers.

Season review

Summary
Wigan Athletic had a tough season, spending much of it in the relegation zone and often in the bottom two. They had eight consecutive losses, between 10 September and 6 November, until earning a draw against fellow strugglers Blackburn Rovers on 19 November. Wigan were rock-bottom from 15 October to 26 November, when winning against Sunderland. They started to improve afterwards, accumulating some points during the Christmas period, but returned to losing ways with four-straight losses, all in January. Once again, after the defeat against Tottenham Hotspur on 31 January, Wigan were bottom in the table. After winning against fellow strugglers Wanderers, Wigan remained bottom on goal difference.

In March, Wigan greatly improved, first losing against Swansea City but earning draws against Aston Villa and West Bromwich Albion. But it was from late March onwards when Wigan completely transformed themselves. They earned wins against Liverpool and Stoke City before a controversial 2–1 defeat against Chelsea, where both of Chelsea's goals were from an offside position. Nevertheless, Wigan were in very strong form and made history after beating Manchester United for the first time. This was followed by their first-ever away win against Arsenal, a defeat to Fulham and their biggest win in the Premier League, a 4–0 demolition of Newcastle United (who were chasing UEFA Champions League football). In the last two games of the season, Wigan beat Blackburn and Wolverhampton Wanderers – both of whom were relegated – to stay in the Premier League. In short, Wigan recorded seven wins in their last nine matches.

Pre-season

League table

Competitions

Pre season

Premier League

League Cup

FA Cup

Players

Captains

First team squad

Appearances and goals

|-
|colspan="14"|Players that played for Wigan this season that have left the club:

|}

Top scorers

Disciplinary record
Includes all competitive matches

Last updated 20 April 2012

Suspensions served

 The red card was successfully appealed and the punishment wasn't served.

Transfers

Players in

Players out

References

External links
Official website

Wigan Athletic F.C. seasons
Wigan Athletic